Donald "Don" George Vines (6 February 1932 – 17 September 1989) was a Welsh rugby union, and professional rugby league footballer who played in the 1950s and 1960s, and a heel wrestler in professional wrestling of the 1960s.

Background
Don Vines was born in Newbridge, Wales, his birth was registered in Newport district, he worked as a blacksmith at Crigglestone Colliery , he worked at Wakefield College , and he died aged 57 in Wakefield, West Yorkshire, England.

Playing career

International honours
Don Vines won caps for Wales (RL) while at Wakefield Trinity 1959…1963 2-caps, and won caps for Great Britain (RL) while at Wakefield Trinity in 1959 against France (2 matches), and Australia, and represented Other Nationalities (RL) while at Wakefield Trinity, he played right-, i.e. number 12, in the 2-19 defeat by St. Helens at Knowsley Road, St. Helens on Wednesday 27 January 1965, to mark the switching-on of new floodlights.

Championship appearances
Don Vines played right-, i.e. number 10, in Wakefield Trinity's 3-27 defeat by Wigan in the Championship Final during the 1959–60 season at Odsal Stadium, Bradford on Saturday 21 May 1960.

Challenge Cup Final appearances
Don Vines played right-, i.e. number 10, in Wakefield Trinity's 38-5 victory over Hull F.C. in the 1959–60 Challenge Cup Final during the 1959–60 season at Wembley Stadium, London on Saturday 14 May 1960, in front of a crowd of 79,773, played left-, i.e. number 11, in St. Helens' 12-6 victory over Wigan in the 1960–61 Challenge Cup Final during the 1960–61 season at Wembley Stadium, London on Saturday 13 May 1961, in front of a crowd of 94,672, and played left- in Wakefield Trinity's 25-10 victory over Wigan in the 1962–63 Challenge Cup Final during the 1962–63 season at Wembley Stadium, London on Saturday 11 May 1963, in front of a crowd of 84,492.

County Cup Final appearances
Don Vines played right-, i.e. number 10, in Oldham's 13-8 victory over Wigan in the 1957–58 Lancashire County Cup Final during the 1957–58 season at Station Road, Swinton on Saturday 19 October 1957, played left-, i.e. number 11, in St. Helens' 15-9 victory over Swinton in the 1960–61 Lancashire County Cup Final during the 1960–61 season at Central Park, Wigan on Saturday 29 October 1960, played right-, i.e. number 12, in Wakefield Trinity's 19-9 victory over Leeds in the 1961–62 Yorkshire County Cup Final during the 1961–62 season at Odsal Stadium, Bradford on Saturday 11 November 1961, and played right- in the 18-2 victory over Leeds in the 1964–65 Yorkshire County Cup Final during the 1964–65 season at Fartown, Huddersfield on Saturday 31 October 1964.

Club career
Don Vines made his début for Wakefield Trinity in the 15-14 victory over Huddersfield at Fartown, Huddersfield on Saturday 27 September 1958.

Contemporaneous article extract
"Don Vines. Playing as off-half for the Welsh Association of Boys' Clubs, then at centre for Welsh Youth against Welsh Secondary Schools, Don started his football career with two caps. That was in 1950. There followed three years in the Army and after that a period with the Newbridge R.U. club, still at centre threequarter. A brief break and then resumption with Newbridge, this time as a forward, but after three more months Don decided to change his code, and signed for Oldham Rugby League Club in 1956. Two years later came another move, this time, we are glad to say, to Trinity. Whilst with us he has gained international honours for Wales v. France, twice for Great Britain v. France, and again, during the recent tour of the Australians, for Great Britain v. Australia. Trinity followers are glad to know that Don is happily settled in Wakefield. We shall look forward to many more grand displays such as he has given since coming to Belle Vue."

Don went to Oxford with Les Gant in the 1970's to guest coach the newly formed Oxford University Rugby League Club. He was excellent and the team is still going strong forty years later.

Genealogical information
Don Vines' marriage to  Patricia B. (née Cook, birth registered during fourth ¼  in Newport district) was registered during second ¼ 1954 in Caerleon district, Wales. They had children; Michelle Vines, Beverley S. Vines (birth registered during fourth ¼  in St. Helens district)and Lee J. Vines (birth registered during third ¼  in Wakefield district)

References

External links
!Great Britain Statistics at englandrl.co.uk (statistics currently missing due to not having appeared for both Great Britain, and England)
Profile at saints.org.uk
Tribute paid to one of Keighley RLFC's 'famous sons'
(archived by web.archive.org) list of matches shown
Blast from the past 1962
Big Geoff was star of No 13 shirt
Wild Angus Campbell
(archived by web.archive.org) Virtual Rugby League Hall of Fame
RUGBY LEAGUE: Veteran duo made club a force to be reckoned with
 ĎŔƑ Rugby League Fans Forum
(archived by web.archive.org) Junior Academy Don Vines Players' Player award
Wrestling Heritage 
Sharing may be answer for 'Cats
(archived by web.archive.org) Don Vines – Wakefield's toughest Welshman remembered
Rugby League Cup Final 1960
Rugby League Final 1963
Search for "Don Vines" at britishnewspaperarchive.co.uk
Search for "Donald Vines" at britishnewspaperarchive.co.uk

1932 births
1989 deaths
Doncaster R.L.F.C. coaches
Footballers who switched code
Great Britain national rugby league team players
Newbridge RFC players
Oldham R.L.F.C. players
Other Nationalities rugby league team players
Rugby league locks
Rugby league players from Caerphilly County Borough
Rugby league props
Rugby league second-rows
Rugby union centres
Rugby union forwards
Rugby union players from Newbridge, Caerphilly
St Helens R.F.C. players
Wakefield Trinity players
Wales national rugby league team players
Welsh male professional wrestlers
Welsh rugby league players
Welsh rugby union players